Gabriela Roepke (1920 in Santiago – November 2013) was a Chilean Dramatist and playwright, theater actress, poet, essay writer and professor of theater.

Gabriela Roepke studied theater in University of Paris (La Sorbonne) and university of North Carolina. She founded Teatro de Ensayo (the Theatre School of the Catholic University of Chile).

in 1966 while Roepke was at the University of the Arts, Philadelphia, she was awarded a Guggenheim Fellowship.

Roepke's plays are often described as ‘psychological drama’. They are also absurd, fantastic and comedic.

Works

Plays
 1954. La invitación (The Invitation) (in Spanish)
 1955. Los culpables (The Guilty), later titled Juegos silenciosos (Silent Games), 1959 (in Spanish)
 1955. Las santas mujeres (The Holy Women) (in Spanish)
 1957. Los peligros de la buena literatura (The Dangers of Good Literature). In Apuntes 18 (1961), 24-40 (in Spanish)
 1958. La telaraña (The web) (in Spanish)
 1959. Juegos silenciosos (Silent games) (in Spanish)
 1959. La mariposa blanca (A white butterfly) (in Spanish)
 1964. El bien fingido (The Feigned Interest) (in Spanish)
 1965. Un castillo sin fantasmas (A Castle Without Ghosts) (in Spanish)
 1965. Martes 13 (Tuesday, the 13th) (in Spanish)

Poem
Primeras canciones (First songs) (1944) 
Jardín solo (1947)

References

Further reading 
 Bello, Andrés. 1982. El teatro chileno de mediados del siglo XX, pp. 163–72. Santiago, Andrés Bello (in Spanish)
 Ehrmann, Hans. 1970. ‘Theatre in Chile: A Middle-Class Conundrum’, Drama Review, 77 – 86
 Knapp Jones, Willis. 1961. ‘Chile’s Dramatic Renaissance’. Hispania, 44.1, 89 - 94

Chilean women dramatists and playwrights
Chilean women poets
2013 deaths
People from Santiago
University of Paris alumni
1920 births
Chilean women artists
20th-century Chilean dramatists and playwrights
Chilean expatriates in France
20th-century Chilean women writers
20th-century Chilean poets